Palazuelos may refer to:

People
Palazuelos (surname)

Places
Palazuelos, Guadalajara, village in Guadalajara, Spain
Palazuelos de Muñó, municipality in Burgos, Castile and León, Spain
Palazuelos de Eresma, village in Segovia, Castile and León, Spain
Palazuelos de la Sierra, municipality in Burgos, Castile and León, Spain